The Malvi or Malavi, also known as Manthani or Mahadeopuri, is breed of zebu cattle from the Malwa plateau in western Madhya Pradesh, in central India. It is a good draught breed; the milk yield of the cows is low.

The breed has been studied at the Government Cattle Breeding Farm at Agar, in Shajapur district of Madhya Pradesh, for more than 50 years.

References

Further reading

Cattle breeds originating in India
Malwa
Cattle breeds